Lakshmi Nivasa is a 1977 Indian Kannada-language film, directed by K. S. R. Das and produced by B. H. Jayanna, B. J. L. Prakash and Smt B. J. Kasthuri. The film stars Ramgopal, Balakrishna, Thoogudeepa Srinivas and Narasimharaju and Padmapriya in the lead roles. The film has musical score by T. G. Lingappa.

Cast

Ramgopal
Padmapriya
Balakrishna
Thoogudeepa Srinivas
Narasimharaju
Prabhakar
Chethan
Basavaraju
Manohar
Narayan
Ramachandra
Gopal
Manu in Guest Appearance
Y. Vijaya
Adavani Lakshmidevi
C. K. Kalavathi
Halam

References

External links
 
 

1977 films
1970s Kannada-language films
Films directed by K. S. R. Das
Films scored by T. G. Lingappa